Calpain small subunit 1 (CSS1), is a protein that in humans is encoded by the CAPNS1 gene.

Function 

Calpains are a ubiquitous, well-conserved family of calcium-dependent, cysteine proteases. Calpain families have been implicated in neurodegenerative processes, as their activation can be triggered by calcium influx and oxidative stress. Calpain I and II are heterodimeric with distinct large subunits associated with common small subunits, all of which are encoded by different genes. The small regulatory subunit consists of an N-terminal domain, containing about 30% glycine residues and a C-terminal Ca-binding domain. Two transcript variants encoding the same protein have been identified for this gene.

Functions

Myotonic dystrophy
This gene encodes a small subunit common to both calpain I and II and is associated with myotonic dystrophy.

Biomarker

'Elevated expression of CAPNS1 has been found to be associated with progression of various cancers such as hepatocellular and renal carcinoma.

References

External links

Further reading 

 
 
 
 
 
 
 
 
 
 
 
 
 
 

EF-hand-containing proteins